The second W. Misick ministry began on 24 February 2021, four days after Washington Misick was sworn in by Governor Nigel Dakin where he invited him to form a new administration following the 2021 general election, in which the Progressive National Party was voted into power with a supermajority of 14 seats in the House of Assembly. Misick led government once before after the 1991 general election.

Cabinet

November 2022 – present 
As of November 2022, the makeup of the Cabinet (in order of ministerial ranking) is:

August 2021 – November 2022

References 

Ministries of Charles III
2021 in the Turks and Caicos Islands
Current governments